Jordan Petaia (born 14 March 2000) is an Australian rugby professional player currently playing for the Queensland Reds in the Super Rugby and for  in international matches. A utility back, Petaia is most often used in the centres for both club and country.

Early life
Petaia is of Samoan and Australian descent. He was born in Victoria in 2000, and raised in Brisbane, Queensland. 

During his time at Brisbane State High School Petaia spent time playing on the wing for the 2016 1st XV Premiership team and in his final year played fullback. In his final year at the school he was selected in the Australian Schools Rugby Union side that played Fiji and New Zealand.  Petaia  has cited former Queensland Reds player Will Genia in the 2011 Super Rugby Final as a turning point in his journey in becoming a professional rugby player.

Rugby career
Petaia made his Super Rugby debut on 7 April 2018, round 8, against the Brumbies at GIO Stadium, Canberra. The Queensland Reds lost 45–21. Petaia scored his first ever try in the Super Rugby and for the Queensland Reds in round 14 against the Hurricanes, losing narrowly, 38–34 in Wellington. Petaia's second try came against rivals the New South Wales Waratahs in round 16. The Queensland Reds lost at home – Suncorp Stadium, Brisbane – 41–52.

International career

Australia
Petaia was called up to the Australia squad by coach Michael Cheika in early August 2018, before Bledisloe Test One in Sydney, New South Wales. However, he did not make the final team to play against New Zealand.

Petaia's international debut was during a pool match against Uruguay in the 2019 Rugby World Cup, scoring a try on his second touch.  He set up another try before being rested at half time.

International tries 
As of 9 August 2022

References

External links
 

2000 births
Australian rugby union players
Australia international rugby union players
Australian sportspeople of Samoan descent
People educated at Brisbane State High School
Queensland Reds players
Rugby union centres
Living people
Queensland Country (NRC team) players
Rugby union players from Melbourne
Rugby union players from Brisbane